This article details statistics relating to the Houston Texans American football team.

Houston Texans records

Team records
 Wins: 12 (2012)
 Home wins: 7 (2016)
 Road wins: 6 (2012)
 Consecutive wins: 9 (2018)
 Consecutive losses: 14 (2013)
 Most points For: 416 (2012)
 Fewest points Allowed: 278 (2011)
 Touchdowns: 46 (2012)
 Most points Scored: 57 vs. Titans (Oct 1, 2017; W 57-14)
 Biggest comeback: 21 vs. Chargers (Sep 9, 2013; W 31-28)
 Biggest lead blown: 24 vs. Chiefs (Jan 12, 2020; L 31-51)

All-time franchise individual records
 Most consecutive starts: 171 Jon Weeks
 Most games played: 171 Jon Weeks
 Most consecutive snaps: 3,884 Chester Pitts

 Completions: 1,951 Matt Schaub
 Attempts: 3,020 Matt Schaub
 Completion percentage: 65.6% Sage Rosenfels
 Passing yards: 23,221 Matt Schaub
 Passing yards per game: 258.0 Matt Schaub
 Passing yards per attempt: 8.0 Ryan Fitzpatrick
 Passing touchdowns: 124 Matt Schaub
 Passer rating: 90.9 Matt Schaub

 Rushing attempts: 1,454 Arian Foster
 Rushing yards: 6,472 Arian Foster
 Rushing average: 4.7 Ben Tate
 Rushing touchdowns: 54 Arian Foster
 Most games, 100 or more yards rushing: 32 Arian Foster
 Rushing yards per game: 85.2 Arian Foster

 Receptions: 1,012 Andre Johnson
 Receiving yards: 13,597 Andre Johnson
 Receiving yards per reception: 16.4 André Davis
 Receiving touchdowns: 64 Andre Johnson
 Most games, 100 or more yards receiving: 51 Andre Johnson
 Receptions per game: 6.0 Andre Johnson
 Receiving yards per game: 80.5 Andre Johnson

 Total touchdowns: 68 Arian Foster
 Yards from scrimmage: 13,651 Andre Johnson
 Total points: 767 Kris Brown

 Quarterback sacks: 101 J. J. Watt
 Total tackles: 658 Brian Cushing
 Solo tackles: 479 DeMeco Ryans
 Assists on tackles: 238 Brian Cushing
 Pass interceptions: 16 Kareem Jackson & Johnathan Joseph
 Pass interception return yards: 410 Johnathan Joseph
 Pass interception touchdown returns: 4 Johnathan Joseph
 Passes defended: 117 Johnathan Joseph
 Forced fumbles: 23 J. J. Watt
 Fumble recoveries: 15 J. J. Watt
 Fumble return yards: 102 DeMeco Ryans
 Forced fumble touchdown returns: 1 (13 players)
 Safeties: 1 (7 players)

 Kick returns: 117 J.J. Moses
 Kick return yards: 2,743 André Davis
 Kick return average: 28.5 Jerome Mathis
 Kick return touchdowns: 3 Jerome Mathis & André Davis

 Punt returns: 179 Jacoby Jones
 Punt return yards: 1,820 Jacoby Jones
 Punt return average: 15.0 Will Fuller
 Punt return touchdowns: 3 Jacoby Jones

 Field goals made: 172 Kris Brown
 Field goals attempted: 223 Kris Brown
 Field goal percentage: 86.8% Neil Rackers
 Punts: 437 Chad Stanley
 Punting yards: 17,908 Chad Stanley
 Punting average: 47.2 Shane Lechler & Donnie Jones

(thru 2020 season)

Single-season individual records
 Passing attempts: 583 Matt Schaub (2009)
 Passing completions: 396 Matt Schaub (2009)
 Completion percentage: 70.2% Deshaun Watson (2020)
 Passing yards: 4,823 Deshaun Watson (2020)
 Passing yards (rookie): 2,664 Davis Mills (2021)
 Passer rating: 112.4 Deshaun Watson (2020)
 Passing touchdowns: 33 Deshaun Watson (2020)
 Passing touchdowns (rookie): 19 Deshaun Watson (2017)
 Passing interceptions: 16 Brock Osweiler (2016)

 Rushing attempts: 351 Arian Foster (2012)
 Rushing yards: 1,616 Arian Foster (2010)
 Rushing average: 5.4 Ben Tate (2011)
 Rushing touchdowns: 16 Arian Foster (2010)
 Most games, 100 or more yards rushing: 9 Arian Foster (2011)

 Receptions by a running back: 68 Domanick Davis (2004)
 Receiving yards by a running back: 617 Arian Foster (2011)
 Receiving touchdowns by a running back: 5 Arian Foster (2014)

 Receptions by a tight end: 70 Owen Daniels (2008)
 Receiving yards by a tight end: 862 Owen Daniels (2008)
 Receiving touchdowns by a tight end: 7 Darren Fells (2019)

 Receptions: 115 DeAndre Hopkins (2018) & Andre Johnson (2008)
 Receiving yards: 1,598 Andre Johnson (2012)
 Receiving average ((minimum 32 receptions)): 17.7 André Davis (2007)
 Receiving touchdowns: 13 DeAndre Hopkins (2017)
 Most games, 100 or more yards receiving: 8 Andre Johnson (2008)

 Yards from scrimmage: 2,220 Arian Foster (2010)
 Total touchdowns: 18 Arian Foster (2010)
 Total points: 138 Shayne Graham (2012)

 Quarterback sacks: 20.5 J. J. Watt (2012 & 2014)
 Interceptions: 7 Marcus Coleman (2003)
 Tackles: 166 Jamie Sharper (2003)
 Touchdowns by a defensive player: 5 J. J. Watt (2014)

 Kick returns: 59 J. J. Moses (2004)
 Kickoff return yards: 1,542 Jerome Mathis (2005)
 Kickoff return average: 30.3 André Davis (2007)
 Kickoff return touchdowns: 3 André Davis (2007)
 Punt returns: 49 Jacoby Jones (2011)
 Punt return yards: 518 Jacoby Jones (2011)
 Punt return average: 15.0 Will Fuller (2016)
 Punt return touchdowns: 2 Jacoby Jones (2008)
 Field goals: 37 Kaʻimi Fairbairn (2018)
 Field goal attempts: 42 Kaʻimi Fairbairn (2018)
 Field goal percentage: 90.0% Neil Rackers (2010)
 Punts: 114 Chad Stanley (2002)
 Punting yards: 4,720 Chad Stanley (2002)
 Punting average: 47.6 Shane Lechler (2013)

Single-game individual records
 Passing yards: 527 Matt Schaub (Nov 18, 2012 vs Jaguars)
 Passing touchdowns: 6 Ryan Fitzpatrick (Nov 30, 2014 vs Titans)
 Passing touchdowns (rookie): 5 Deshaun Watson (Oct 8, 2017 vs Chiefs)
 Passing completions: 43 Matt Schaub (Nov 18, 2012 vs Jaguars)
 Passing attempts: 62 Matt Schaub (Dec 13, 2010 vs Ravens)
 Most consecutive pass completions: 22 David Carr (Nov 19, 2006 vs Bills)
 Passer rating: 158.3 Deshaun Watson (Oct 6, 2019 vs Falcons)

 Rushing attempts: 36 Alfred Blue (Nov 16, 2014 vs Browns)
 Rushing yards: 231 Arian Foster (Sep 12, 2010 vs Colts)
 Rushing touchdowns: 3 Ben Tate (Dec 1, 2013 vs Patriots), Arian Foster (Sep 12, 2010 vs Colts) & Ryan Moats (Nov 1, 2009 vs Bills)

 Receptions: 14 Andre Johnson (Nov 18, 2012 vs Jaguars) & Will Fuller V (Oct 6, 2019 vs Falcons)
 Receiving yards: 273 Andre Johnson (Nov 18, 2012 vs Jaguars)
 Receiving touchdowns: 3 Andre Johnson (Nov 3, 2013 vs Colts) & DeAndre Hopkins (Oct 8, 2017 vs Chiefs) & Will Fuller V (Oct 6, 2019 vs Falcons)

 Interceptions: 3 Glover Quin (Nov 28, 2010 vs Titans)
 Quarterback sacks: 4 Connor Barwin (Nov 27, 2011 vs Jaguars)
 Tackles: 19 Kamu Grugier-Hill (Dec 5, 2021 vs Colts)

 Longest rushing play: 97 yards (Touchdown) Lamar Miller (Nov 26, 2018 vs Titans)
 Longest pass play: 81 yards David Carr to Corey Bradford (Oct 13, 2002 vs Bills)
 Longest touchdown pass: 80 yards Matt Schaub to Jacoby Jones (Nov 13, 2011 at Buccaneers)
 Longest kick return: 104 yards (Touchdown) André Davis (Dec 30, 2007 vs Jaguars)
 Longest punt return: 87 yards (Touchdown) Keshawn Martin (Nov 17, 2013 vs Raiders)
 Most kick return touchdowns: 2 (Tied for NFL Record) André Davis (Dec 30, 2007 vs Jaguars)
 Longest interception return: 102 yards (Touchdown) Marcus Coleman (Sep 26, 2004 at Chiefs)
 Longest punt: 71 Yards Shane Lechler (Oct 9, 2014 vs Colts) & Bryan Anger (Sep 29, 2019 vs Panthers)
 Longest field goal: 61 Yards Ka'imi Fairbairn (Dec 12, 2021 vs Seahawks)

Season-by-season win and loss records

The Texans have competed in the NFL since their inaugural season in 2002. In that time, the team has compiled 6 winning seasons, finishing 9–7 in 2009, 10–6 in 2011, 12–4 in 2012 and 9-7 in 2014, 2015, and 2016. They have also had two non-losing seasons, as they finished 8–8 in 2007 and 2008.

The Texans first reached the post season in 2011 as the AFC South champion and repeated as division champs in 2012, 2015, and 2016. As of 2017, they are one of four active NFL teams that have yet to appear in a Super Bowl along with the Cleveland Browns, Detroit Lions, and Jacksonville Jaguars.

records
American football team records and statistics